Ordway Tead (10 September 1891 – November 1973) was an American organizational theorist, adjunct professor of industrial relations at Columbia University, chair of the New York Board of Higher Education, and first president of the Society for Advancement of Management (SAM) in 1936–37.

Biography 
Tead was born in Sommerville, Massachusetts and attended Amherst College from where he obtained his AB 1912. In 1915 he married Clara Murohy, long term president of Briarcliff College.

After his graduation he served as fellow of the Amherst College from 1912 to 1914. In 1915 he co-founded Valentine, Tead & Gregg, an industrial consultants' firm in Boston,  Massachusetts. In 1917 he accepted a position in the Bureau of Industrial Research in New York City. Following the U.S.A.'s entry into the First World War he ran the War Department's employment management course at Columbia University.

Tead continued to teach at Columbia University from 1920 to 1950 and was adjunct professor of industrial relations until 1956. From 1938 to 1953 he was chair of the New York Board of Higher Education, where in 1941 he was involved in sacking any faculty staff who belonged to a Communist, Fascist or Nazi organization.

In the year 1936-37 Tead served as first president of the Society for Advancement of Management (SAM) in 1936-37, where he was succeeded by William H. Gesell. He was actively involved in book publishing both at McGraw Hill and Harper & Row and wrote 21 books himself.

Publications
 Tead, Ordway. Instincts in industry, a study of working-class psychology. 1918
 Tead, Ordway, and Henry Clayton Metcalf. Personnel administration: its principles and practice. No. 18. McGraw-Hill Book Company, inc., 1920.
 Tead, Ordway. The art of leadership. (1935).
 Tead, Ordway. The art of administration. (1951).
 Tead, Ordway. Human nature and management. Arno Press, 1977.

Articles, a selection
 Tead, Ordway. "Trade Unions and Efficiency," American Journal of Sociology, Vol.22, No.1. (July 1916), p. 30-37.
 Tead, Ordway. "The War's Effects on English Trade Unions," The Journal of Political Economy, Vol.26, No.2, (Feb. 1918), p. 125-135.
 Tead, Ordway. "The British Reconstruction Programs," Political Science Quarterly, Vol.33, No.1. (Mar. 1918), p. 56-76.*
 Tead, Ordway. "The Problem of Graduate Training in Personnel Administration," The Journal of Political Economy, Vol.29, No.5. (May 1921), p. 353-367
  Tead, Ordway. "Autobiographical essay" in Finkelstein, L. (ed.) Thirteen Americans: Their Spiritual Autobiographies, Institute for Religious and Social Science, 1953, pp. 15–30

References

External links 

 Guide to the Ordway Tead Papers, Cornell University
 

1891 births
1973 deaths
Columbia University faculty
20th-century American educators
American organizational theorists
American business executives
Amherst College alumni
People from Somerville, Massachusetts